Aubrey Omari Joseph (born November 26, 1997) is an American actor best known for his role as Tyrone Johnson / Cloak in Freeform's Cloak & Dagger.

Career
Aubrey started acting on the stage, portraying Simba in the Broadway musical The Lion King, a role he alternated with Judah Bellamy.

Aubrey has his first major, starring role after being cast in January 2017 as Tyrone Johnson / Cloak, one of the lead characters, in the Marvel's Cloak & Dagger television series. The show, set within the larger Marvel Cinematic Universe, aired on Freeform, jointly produced by the network,
Marvel Television, based on the Marvel Comics characters of the same name. Aubrey felt his casting was coincidental. "At the time that I got the audition, I was in the middle of trying to watch season one of Luke Cage, so it was crazy just how ironic everything was at that moment." The series ran for two seasons, concluding in May 2019 and was canceled that October. Joseph along with his Cloak & Dagger co-star Olivia Holt returned to voice their respective characters on the Disney XD animated series Spider-Man and reprised their roles for a two-episode crossover in the third and final season of Marvel's Runaways. Aubrey released his debut album, XXl, on July 24, 2020.

Personal life
Aubrey Joseph is the middle child of three boys.

Filmography

Accolades

References

External links 

 
 
 

Living people
1997 births
21st-century American male actors
Place of birth missing (living people)
American male television actors